Kerry Drue is the former Attorney General of the United States Virgin Islands.  After being confirmed in September 2005, Drue resigned in January, 2007. Prior to becoming attorney general, Drue served as the head of the civil division for the Justice Department of the USVI.

Education
J.D., Harvard Law School, 1991
B.A., Princeton University, 1988

External links
NAAG bio

References

Living people
1960s births
Harvard Law School alumni
Princeton University alumni
American lawyers
United States Virgin Islands politicians
United States Attorneys General